Takaba is a town in Mandera County, in northeastern Kenya. According to the 2009 census, the town was the fourth most populous in the county with a population of 21,474. The town has a functional airstrip. The headquarters of Mandera West sub-county are located in Takaba.

Takaba is located approximately halfway between the major towns of Moyale and Mandera.

References

Populated places in Mandera County